Raymond Henry Bass (January 15, 1910 – March 10, 1997) was a Rear Admiral in the United States Navy, gymnast and Olympic medalist in the 1932 Summer Olympics. He competed at the 1932 Summer Olympics in Los Angeles where he won a gold medal in  rope climbing.

Bass died on March 10, 1997, at the age of 87.

References

External links
 

1910 births
1997 deaths
Gymnasts at the 1932 Summer Olympics
Olympic gold medalists for the United States in gymnastics
American male artistic gymnasts
Medalists at the 1932 Summer Olympics